Reyner is a surname, and has also been used as a given name. Notable people with the name include:

 Reyner Banham (1922–1988), English architectural critic
 Clement Reyner (1589–1651), English Benedictine monk
 Edward Reyner (1600–c.1668), English nonconforming clergyman
 Harry Reyner (1889–1978), American politician, mayor of Newport News, Virginia

See also
 Rayner
 Reyners (disambiguation)